Chandy/Idiculla is the Greek-Malayalam name meaning Alexander. It may refer to:

 Anna Chandy (1905–1996), first woman Judge of India
 Arjun Chandy, Indo-american singer
 Jacob Chandy (1910–2007), Indian neurosurgeon and teacher
 K.M. Chandy (politician) (1921–1998), Indian politician
 K. Mani Chandy (born 1944), professor of Computer Science
 K. T. Chandy (1913–2006), Indian education administrator and business executive
 Nomita Chandy, Indian social worker from Bangalore
 Oommen Chandy (born 1943), nineteenth Chief Minister of Kerala, India
 Palliveettil Chandy (latinized Alexander de Campo; 1615–1687), Indian bishop of Saint Thomas Christians
 Rajesh Chandy, American entrepreneur
 Thomas Chandy (1947–2019), former transport minister of Kerala, India
 Rohini Mariam Idicula, Indian actress, anchor and model
 Iyyapan Chandy (1966–2045), Former Politician in india

See also
 Chandyr River, a tributary of the Atrek River in Turkmenistan